Korpysy  is a village in the administrative district of Gmina Ostrzeszów, within Ostrzeszów County, Greater Poland Voivodeship, in west-central Poland.

From 1815 to 1918 and then again from 1939 to 1945 Korpysy had a German name Ottosberg.

References

Villages in Ostrzeszów County